Home Cured is a 1926 American comedy film directed by Roscoe Arbuckle.

Cast
 Johnny Arthur
 Virginia Vance
 George Davis
 Glen Cavender

See also
 Fatty Arbuckle filmography

External links

1926 films
Films directed by Roscoe Arbuckle
1926 short films
American silent short films
American black-and-white films
Silent American comedy films
American comedy short films
1926 comedy films
1920s American films